Carex haematorrhyncha is a species of plant in the family Cyperaceae first described by Jisaburo Ohwi and Tetsuo Michael Koyama. No subspecies are listed in the Catalogue of Life.

References

haematorrhyncha